The 2014 Yas Marina GP2 Series round was a GP2 Series motor race held on November 21 and 22, 2014 at Yas Marina Circuit, Abu Dhabi. It was the  final showdown of the 2014 GP2 Series. The race supported the 2014 Abu Dhabi Grand Prix.

Classification

Qualifying

Feature race

Sprint race

See also 
 2014 Abu Dhabi Grand Prix
 2014 Yas Marina GP3 Series round

References

Yas Marina
GP2
Yas Marina